Stefano Gori (born 9 March 1996) is an Italian professional footballer who plays as a goalkeeper for  club Perugia, on loan from Juventus.

Club career
He made his Serie B debut for Bari on 18 May 2017 in a game against SPAL.

On 28 June 2020, he joined Juventus.

On 15 January 2021, Gori returned to Pisa on a loan until the end of the season. On 21 June, Gori was loaned to Como.

On 13 July 2022, Gori joined Perugia on a season-long loan.

References

External links
 

1996 births
Footballers from Brescia
Living people
Italian footballers
Association football goalkeepers
Italy youth international footballers
Brescia Calcio players
A.C. Milan players
Juventus F.C. players
S.S.C. Bari players
Pisa S.C. players
Como 1907 players
A.C. Perugia Calcio players
Serie B players
Serie C players